William John Kirchiro is a former American football player. Kirchiro was selected in the seventh round of the 1962 NFL Draft and played in the National Football League for one season.

Kirchiro was born in 1940 in Bernardsville, New Jersey and attended Bernards High School. He attended college at the University of Maryland. There, he played football for the Maryland Terrapins as an offensive guard. In 1961, Kirchiro was named to the All-ACC second-team and received the James Tatum Memorial Award for the Maryland Terrapins' Lineman of the Year.

Kirchiro was selected in the seventh round of the 1962 NFL Draft by the St. Louis Cardinals. He instead went to play for the Baltimore Colts. During his only season in the NFL, Kirchiro played in eight games and recovered one opponent fumble.

References

Maryland Terrapins football players
Baltimore Colts players
Bernards High School alumni
People from Bernardsville, New Jersey
Living people
1940 births
Players of American football from New Jersey
Sportspeople from Somerset County, New Jersey